Hugo Suárez Vaca (born February 7, 1982 in Santa Cruz de la Sierra) is a Bolivian footballer who currently plays goalkeeper for Wilstermann in the Liga de Fútbol Profesional Boliviano.

During his professional career he also played for Real Santa Cruz, Wilstermann in three periods, Real Potosí and Oriente Petrolero.

He has been capped for the Bolivia national team 13 times.

External links
 Profile at BoliviaGol.com 
 
 

1982 births
Living people
Sportspeople from Santa Cruz de la Sierra
Bolivian footballers
Bolivia international footballers
Association football goalkeepers
C.D. Jorge Wilstermann players
Club Real Potosí players
Oriente Petrolero players
Club Blooming players
2007 Copa América players
2015 Copa América players